Rosamel Island is a circular island  in diameter with precipitous cliffs of volcanic rock rising to a snow-covered peak  high, lying west of Dundee Island in the south entrance to Antarctic Sound. It is part of the James Ross Island Volcanic Group.

The island was discovered by the French expedition, 1837–40, under Captain Jules Dumont d'Urville, and named by him for V. Admiral Claude de Rosamel, French Minister of Marine under whose orders the expedition sailed.

See also 
 List of antarctic and sub-antarctic islands

References

Islands of the Joinville Island group
Volcanic islands
Volcanoes of Graham Land